Maria Borisovna of Tver (Мария Борисовна in Russian) (1442 – 1467) was Grand Princess consort of Muscovy, married in 1452, to Grand Prince Ivan III and daughter of Boris Alexandrovich of Tver.

When Vasili II (Ivan III's father) was getting ready to attack Dmitry Shemyaka, he found an ally in the person of Boris of Tver. The two decided to seal the alliance by arranging a betrothal between the future Ivan III and Maria of Tver in 1452. It appears that she died from poisoning in 1467. However, if one is to believe Joseph Volotsky, she had been suffering from "infirmity" since childhood. She gave birth to Ivan the Young in 1458.

References

|-

|-

|-

1440s births
1467 deaths
Russian royal consorts
15th-century Russian people
15th-century Russian women